George Wilson CB (of the civil division) (13 May 1862 - 12 December 1943) also known as bwana tayari - "Mr ready", amongst natives in the East Africa protectorate region, was a general African staff employee of the Imperial British East African company (1890-1891), was (the then Captain) Sir Frederick D. Lugard's Chief Lieutenant from 1889 to 1890, and was the second in command during Lugard's caravan expedition to Uganda on 6 August 1890 where Lugard travelled with 120 Swahilis, 9 Persian transport attendants/agriculturalists and four other Europeans, besides George Wilson. They were Fenwick De Winton (son of Sir Francis who was Lugard's chief), William Grant and Archibald Brown. George Joined the Uganda Service/government in 1894 and was in civil charge of the Protectorate during the outbreak of the Sudanese Mutiny. He was appointed first class transport officer then the 1st class assistant of the Uganda protectorate on 30 August 1894. Was the sub-commissioner of the Buganda Kingdom in 1895. Also Was the acting commissioner and the commander in chief of the Uganda Protectorate and the consul-general (5 November 1897 - 29 January 1898). Was awarded the C.B. on 2 January 1899. He was the first ever Chief collector for the Bunyoro district (August 1900 - 17 November 1901) and was the deputy commissioner of the Uganda Protectorate at Entebbe, government house(1 April 1902 - 1904) and deputy governor of the protectorate (2 December 1907 - 1 March 1909). He was H.M. - His Majesty's commander in chief and acting commissioner of the Uganda protectorate (1904-1906) and (27 April 1907 - November 1907). Was a fellow at the Royal Society of Arts and a silver medal recipient since 28 June 1907.

Early life 

George Wilson was born in 1862 in Glasgow, Scotland. His parents were George Wilson (senior) who was a sculptor and Jane Leslie whose occupation was household duties. George was moved to Australia when he was just 5 years of age. he grew up in a rough background in Australia then went on to become a music hall entertainer. After that he sailed off and arrived in East Africa in 1889 with his brother (Charles Wilson) independently of the IBEA.

Exploration of East Africa and British colonial service 

According to the diaries of Lord Lugard, George Wilson was working amongst ex-slaves and coastal tribes near Mombasa in 1889 and subsequently joined the company in January 1890 and joined Lugard on 6 August 1890, on the Sabaki trip in which Lugard's caravan left the coast at Malindi and moved slowly up the Sabaki, thereon after crossing Tsavo, they came across a Swahili caravan with slaves that were being transported by traders who fled but were later caught by Lugard and placed on trial in Mombasa. Meanwhile some of the slaves were successfully freed and the malnourished children were fed and clothed. But by 12 September Wilson's health had deteriorated to the point of losing consciousness and having a very weak pulse so Lugard acted quickly by taking Wilson to his tent and using natural medicine like rubbing him with carbolic oil to jump-start the heart beats, which seemed to have worked, and so George was given whiskey to ease the pain; however, his health challenges continued that evening and so Lugard stayed up nursing Wilson all night, which saved his life. from various accounts George was committed to joining Lugard for his Uganda expedition in 1890. Captain Lugard Knew him well and formed a high opinion of Wilson as he was "very successful with the kikuyu" and they stayed in touch long after Lugard had left Uganda, as a matter of Fact Mr Wilson sent back and forth letters to Lugard between 1895-1900 involving frank discussions about important issues, when Mr Wilson was rising up the ranks of the protectorate government in East Africa. For a while Mr Wilson was with the Scottish Industrial Mission at Kibwezi where they met up in Mombasa tasked with taking back control of Fort Dagoretti on 19 September 1891. Lugard, on his way back to the Coast in August 1892, found George at work on the Mackinnon Road, which was being built by the Mission at the cost of Sir William Mackinnon to increase trade with Uganda. Wilson joined the Uganda service on 30 August 1894. He soon made his mark as officer in charge of Kampala station. He demonstrated effective leadership, and was hence placed in charge of the protectorate region during the Sudanese Mutiny in September 1897. There's an extensive account In John Dawson Ainsworth's memoirs about how George Wilson was ambushed by the kikuyus under the command of Waiyaki Wa Hinga for a week and a half, which forced Wilson and his men to vacate the fort in Dagoretti at night and head towards Machakos on the 30th March 1891 under the advice of Ernest Gedge with his men and the 30 African soldiers he had. This was reportedly the first major confrontation between the Agikuyus and the British imperialist forces. According to Maina wa Kĩnyattĩ a marxist historian - this defeat along with another successive defeat for Wilson and his men that were unable to sustain Waiyaki lead attacks (following a recapture and rebuilding of the station at Dagoertti) that meant the loss of control of the previously burned garrison in a dash for safety back to Machakos where their headquarters were (which was built by Lugard in 1889), is in fact what led to Wilson's replacement by Colonel Erick Smith, who refocused his efforts on building another fort in Kanyonyo that he later named "Fort Smith".

On the other hand, when Wilson, who had only barely recovered from his sabaki trip with Captain Lugard, and who was in charge of the fort that he and Lugard built to near completion in Oct 1890 that he was tasked with finishing off could not (along with his 40 porters and askaris) defend against the kikuyus to remain in the station especially because he was running out of ammunition and supplies and did not receive any new stock from the coast that was sent to him (following Lugard's departure in November 1890), he was (according to multiple accounts including one from Lugard),unfairly dismissed by the IBEA company for abandoning the station, however the company blamed his ambush on the mistreatment of natives. Even though George and the multiple officials there, maintained that the company was responsible for the failure, due to the lack of assistance even after a request was sent. Other accounts from people that met George Wilson like John Walter Gregory claim that George was persuaded to retire from his IBEA post by the leaders of a caravan returning from Uganda following the failed project, as opposed to being abruptly dismissed. It is hard to find one isolating factor that led to the kikuyus' besieging of the Dagoretti fort against Wilson and his men, especially considering that Wilson initially struck a positive friendship with the Agikuyus; however, one suggestion from an associate professor and author at Biola University named Evanson Wamagatta is that, days after Lugard left for Uganda, his men and officials at Dagoertti did not honour the IBEA agreement and the blood-brotherhood that Lugard made with the Waikikuyu and its leader Waiyaki because what followed was the forcible recruitment of the kikuyu's as porters, purposeful theft of things like food from the kikuyus, local squabbles between IBEA officials and the Kikuyu residents, Harassment and sexual assault of the kikuyu women, along with the failure of the kikuyu to be paid for supplying and delivering food to the man in charge - George Wilson. Nonetheless, despite his frictional encounters in the first 3 years of engaging with the natives via IBEA, George's long term career was not damaged furthermore more he was eager whilst patient when it came to dealing with the natives. He could speak several of the local languages, had spent some noticeable period of time working as an administrator in the Nile province anxious but determined to push for administrative expansion into the North East and was known to be a good judge of character with his sharp assessments hence why he was known as bwana tayari - an official who knew the country better than anyone else, who was also described as 'L'etat c'est moi.' by the late Sir John Milner Gray. By 30 August 1894 George Wilson was appointed the first class transport officer then the 1st class assistant of the Uganda protectorate, afterwards. Then on 31 July 1895 he existed in the capacity of a sub-commissioner of the Buganda Kingdom and was the principal British official in Buganda at the time. Then from 5 November 1897 to 29 January 1898, Wilson was the acting commissioner and the commander in chief of the Uganda Protectorate and the consul-general in the absence of colonel Ternan and following his 1894 Uganda service against the Sudanese mutiny, he was awarded the (Civil)Companion of the most honourable order of the bath (CB) for his outstanding military efforts - which is second only to a knighthood. despite not being a trained soldier. It all began when George Wilson (chief political officer at the time) uncovered a serious plot amidst the Nandi expedition which resulted in the arrest of two Baganda chiefs to whom George Wilson charged with incitement to revolt. More information about the mutiny can be found in Hubert's: King's African Rifles. In the following years, George oversaw important developments in the Protectorate region like the Buganda agreement of the 1900, he was deeply involved in shaping the administrative policies of Uganda by working closely with local chiefs and establishing a formal relationship with them to create an administrative system of governance that works for everyone, one of the ways in which George did this was by increasingly relinquishing more judicial responsibility to chiefs in the local hierarchy and to the African courts, this system of government crafted by the innovation of Wilson was to be the style and format of administration in Uganda for the following 60 years, and so he was subsequently described as being the chief architect of Uganda's native policies. He was also largely responsible for tempering the hostile behaviour senior officials at Entebbe had towards Bunyoro natives. On 1 April 1902 he was made the deputy commissioner of the Uganda protectorate in Entebbe until 1906, and in between those dates Commissioner Wilson helped push forward the efforts and the works of the sleeping sickness commission made up of medical experts and other officials in Uganda that were sent by the British Royal Society to investigate the Sleeping sickness outbreak in Uganda and the wider region of East Africa. Wilson also lobbied the colonial office to give greater protections to African farmers, including the right to kill elephants that reportedly frequently attacked people, however the underlying reason for this lobbying that he and Sadler (whom Wilson was deputy to) pushed for, was for the express purpose of maintaining the annual colonial income, this is evidenced by the fact that when Commissioner Wilson attended the 1906 Annual General meeting hosted by the Royal African Society in London, he stated that the value and volume of Ivory exports had recently fallen for the Protectorate colony, thereby reducing colonial income for that financial year. Then in 1904 to 1906 George was appointed His Majesty's commander in chief and acting commissioner of the Uganda protectorate and in between those two years he was responsible for receiving multiple outbreak reports one of which is well documented in the journal of the royal army medical corps and following this - in January 1908 Wilson issued a notice banning all fishing activities on Lake Victoria. “All fishing upon the lake shores is illegal, any subject of His Highness found fishing would be liable to punishment,” the notice read in part. Amidst all this George was also responsible for carrying out a range of other day-to-day engagement and administration roles. commissioner Wilson was also known for leading the inquiry in to the death of Harry George Galt - a man regarded as a ruthless colonial officer that had been recently appointed sub-commissioner of the western province of the protectorate, before being murdered with a spear by a native. Wilson was convinced Galt's death was politically motivated and so he cautioned in 1905 that the spirit of unrest in ankole would not subside until the Protectorate government thoroughly investigates and takes decisive actions against the perpetrators responsible. There's a book by Edward I. Steinhart published in 1977 that goes into depth about the investigation and the decisions that George Wilson made following the inquiry. Also the Galt series article goes into depth about Henry Galt and his murder. On 28 March 1907 Sir Henry Hesketh Bell wrote to the secretary of state for the colonies - Victor Bruce, to inform him that his deputy - George Wilson C.B. will be drawing up the annual colonial report for the financial year of 1905-6 for the East African Protectorate instead because he administered the protectorate government during a significant portion of the year under review. Less than a month later on 27 April 1907, upon Sir Hesketh Bell's leave, Wilson took over once again as H.M. commander in chief of the Uganda Protectorate up until at least 22 October 1907. And so once Sir Hesketh Bell returned, he became deputy Commissioner; however, upon (the then Under-secretary of state for the colonies) Sir Winston Churchill's visit to Uganda in December of that year, Sir Hesketh Bell was appointed governor which automatically made George Wilson deputy governor of the Uganda Protectorate. Finally George Wilson retired from his position as deputy governor of the protectorate due to ill-health on 1 March 1909; however, he did retire with one of the highest pensions and annual salaries amongst the officials in that year.

Achievements and Honours 

On 28 November, Mengo Hospital (also known as Namirembe Hospital) was founded by the acting commissioner George Wilson.Hoima which was a chain of forts in a region of the bunyoro district dates back to 1894, it was established as the capital of Bunyoro in 1900 by Commissioner Wilson and from thereon it was formally recognised by the commissioner, as the chief administrative centre of the bunyoro district.Due to his outstanding service and leadership during the 1894 Sudanese mutiny he was awarded a CB on 2 January 1899. Sir Albert cook reflects on Wilson's work post retirement in his book and remarks " he (George Wilson) richly deserved his CB". He spent time writing about his experience living in the tropical country of Uganda, and his 28-page notes were published as a book called Uganda; notes for travellers, by Mr George Wilson, CB which can also be found on the UK national archives website in their colonial office records.On an evening conference on 7 November 1906 whilst he was still H.M. commander in chief of Uganda, he attended the annual meeting in London where he was the special guest of honour Hosted by the Royal African Society, to read out his much awaited paper to which he got much praise for, titled:" The progress of the Uganda Protectorate" a few months later on 15 January 1907 he read out the same paper as the principal guest of the evening hosted by the Royal Society of Arts and chaired by Wilson's old friend and comrade Sir Frederick Lugard - 5 months later on 28 June 1907 George Wilson was awarded a silver medal and was made a fellow of the Royal society of Arts for his important contributions via the paper he wrote on the progress of the Uganda protectorate Wilson was also involved with coming up with new ideas of setting up an efficient postage system in Uganda given the poor communication systems that existed at the time so he consulted with Rev. Ernest Millar, who worked for the Church Missionary Society at Mengo to take up the responsibility of looking into it.On 25 January 1905, H.M. acting commissioner George Wilson C.B, formally opened Mengo high school which was a step forward for education. In The following year on 29 March 1906, George Wilson who was still the acting commissioner, declared the opening of King's college Budo who had the youngest native King Daudi Chwa next to him along with Bishop Tucker, in the official photograph.
On the morning of January 15, 1908. Wilson's secretary uses the typewriter to place into writing on a letter the instructions given out by the deputy governor - George Wilson. Wilson, then instructs every colonial administration in the land to buy all items of antique and cultural value and send them to the colonial capital - Entebbe, which was only agreed upon last minute. From his office.

Mr Wilson's letter read as follows: "I am directed to inform you that his excellency the Governor has made arrangements for the opening in Entebbe of a Protectorate Museum, for the collection of local curios of all descriptions, such as articles of interest and specimen of native weapons and manufactures, and local products, vegetables and mineral: in fact of all articles of historical, ethnological and local industries of interest"

The Uganda Museum now stands as the oldest museum in East Africa, founded in 1908 by deputy governor George Wilson CB who first pitched the Idea back in 1902 for the collection of objects of interest throughout the protectorate region. Interestingly there is a place called   Fort George in western Uganda that was built by Captain Lugard, that he named after George Mackenzie and George Wilson.

Personal life 

On 20 February 1900 George Wilson CB, married a woman named Clarissa Adelina Humphreys (daughter of colonel James Charlton Humphreys) In East Twickenham Clarissa then lived in Uganda with her husband afterwards, they then both lived in the address of: 6 marine parade, st leonard church, hythe, Kent, in 1922 this is further evidenced by the 1921 England and Wales census - long after George Wilson had retired from colonial service and soon after he and his wife had moved from their previous address in Laleham middlesex They both then later on moved to another location called: The farthing Lyminge in Kent Finally their last noticeable move was to Royal Tunbridge wells in kent which was confirmed by the 1939 England and Wales census, and where they lived for the rest of their lives - George Wilson died on 12 December 1943 at Royal Tunbridge Wells, after which the RSA made an obituary for him. His wife died on the 5th July 1958 at Southfields nursing home in Eastbourne Sussex.

However when George Wilson at the end of 1894, replaced Ansorge as the chief British official at Kampala he had with him at the time two African wives one of them was Zanzibari and the other a Maasai that were kept in the Kampala fort he also had with him a Swahili wife from Mombasa, however as a street where the Swahili woman is from is the same one that was named after George Wilson it is understood that "mwembe tayari" is used to reference where the native woman is from and the area that was named after Wilson. He had at least one child which was with the Swahili wife, and that child's name was Edward Wilson, and Edward Wilson had 21 children whom also had their own children thus creating a huge family tree. now only two grandchildren of Commissioner Wilson remain alive, however he is also survived by his many great, 2nd great and 3rd great, grand children.

Published work 

"The progress of the Uganda Protectorate"

Uganda; notes for travellers, by Mr George Wilson, CB (28 pages)

References

Bibliography 

 
 
 
 
 
 
 
 
 
 
 
 
 
 
 
 
 
 
 
 
 
 
 
 
 
 
 
 
 
 
 
 
 
 
 
 
 
 
 
 
 
 
 
 
 
 
 
 
 
 
 
 
 
 
 
 
 
 
 
 
 
 
 
 
 
 
 
 
 
 
 
 
 
 
 
 
 

1862 births
1943 deaths
Uganda Protectorate people